Tee-To-Tum was the name of a sports ground in Stamford Hill, London in the 19th century. The Hackney TeeToTum cricket team played there, and it also hosted athletics events such as the professional '25 Mile World Championships'.

'Hackney TeeToTum' were an amateur cricket team that played at Stamford Hill in the late 19th century. Their 'TeeToTum ground' was also used as an amenity for sporting and social events.

References

Defunct cricket grounds in England